The Journal of Behavioral Addictions is a quarterly peer-reviewed academic journal published by Akadémiai Kiadó (Budapest, Hungary). It publishes manuscripts on the different aspects of non-substance addictions and the addictive patterns of various behaviors. The current editor-in-chief is Zsolt Demetrovics (University of Gibraltar). It was founded in 2011 by Eötvös Loránd University, and is a gold open access journal.

Abstracting and indexing 
The journal is abstracted and indexed in: 

 Science Citation Index Expanded
 Journal Citation Reports/Science Edition
 Journal Citation Reports/Social Sciences Edition
 Social Sciences Citation Index
 Current Contents®/Social and Behavioral Sciences
 EBSCO
 Google Scholar
 PsycINFO
 PubMed Central
 Scopus
 MEDLINE
 CABI

According to the Journal Citation Reports, the journal has a 2021 impact factor of 7.772, and is ranked 26 (out of 155) in the category of Psychiatry journals (Science Citation Index Expanded).

References 

Addiction medicine journals